This is a list of singles that have peaked in the top 10 of the Irish Singles Chart during 2021, as compiled by the Official Charts Company on behalf of the Irish Recorded Music Association.

Background

Ninety-five songs have charted in the top ten of the Irish Singles Chart in 2021. Of these, eighty-six songs have reached their peak during 2021. Irish singer-songwriter Dermot Kennedy and Italian producers Meduza took the first number one single of the year, with their track "Paradise". In doing so, Kennedy became the first Irish act to replace themselves twice at number one, replacing the last number one of 2020, "Giants". Ed Sheeran's "Afterglow" became the first new track to enter the top-ten in 2021.

Chart debuts
Forty artists has achieved their first top 10 single in 2021 (as of 17 December), either as a lead or featured artist.

Top-ten singles
Key
 – indicates single's top 10 entry was also its chart debut
 An asterisk indicates the track is in the top 10 dated 17 December 2021.

2020 peaks

Entries by artist
The following table shows artists who achieved two or more top 10 entries in 2021, including songs that reached their peak in 2020. The figures include both main artists and featured artists. The culmulative number of weeks an artist's tracks spent in the top ten in 2021 is also shown.

Notes 

 "Sweet Melody" by Little Mix spent 3 weeks in the top 10 in 2020.
 "The Business" by Tiësto spent 4 weeks in the top 10 in 2020.
 deep house cover of Scott's track which was originally released in 2016.
 "All I Want for Christmas Is You" first entered the top-ten and reached its peak in 1994.
 "Last Christmas" first entered the top-ten and reached its peak in 1984.
 "Rockin' Around the Christmas Tree first entered the top-ten in 1963 and reached its peak in 2017.
 "Fairytale of New York" first entered the top-ten and reached its peak in 1987.
 "Meet Me at Our Spot" is credited to The Anxiety, a collaborative project between the two artists.
 "Merry Christmas Everyone" first entered the top-ten and reached its peak in 1985.
 "It's Beginning to Look a Lot Like Christmas" by Michael Bublé spent 1 week in the top 10 in 2020.

References

2021 in Irish music
Irish record charts
Ireland Singles
Ireland 2021